Sir Bernard Augustus Keen FRS (5 September 1890 – 5 August 1981) was a British soil scientist and Fellow of University College London. He was elected a Fellow of the Royal Society in 1935.

References

Further reading
 ‘KEEN, Sir Bernard (Augustus)’, Who Was Who, A & C Black, 1920–2008; online edn, Oxford University Press, Dec 2007 accessed 4 June 2011
 

1890 births
1981 deaths
Fellows of the Royal Society
Presidents of the Royal Meteorological Society
Knights Bachelor
British soil scientists